Stephen Anthony Ukpo (16 July 1947 – 6 September 2021) was Minister of Information and Culture, and then Governor of Rivers State, Nigeria, from August 1986 until July 1988 during the military administration of General Ibrahim Babangida.

Military career
Ukpo was born in Okpoma, Yala, Cross River State, on 16 July 1947. Joining the army, he was appointed Company Commander (1968), Battalion Commander (1969 and 1971 – 1973), Brigade Major (1970) and Instructor, Nigeria Defence Academy, Kaduna (1973–1974).

He was a member of the inner circle of army officers who arranged the bloodless coup on 27 August 1985 when General Muhammadu Buhari was replaced by General Ibrahim Babangida. After the coup he was appointed a member of the AFRC.

He was appointed deputy director, Defence Intelligence Agency (1985). 

On 12 September 1985, he was sworn in as Minister of Information and Culture.

He was appointed military governor of Rivers State on 26 August 1986.
In this post, he inaugurated the provisional council of the Rivers State Polytechnic.

He reassigned to become principal staff officer to President Ibrahim Babangida in July 1988. In this role in April 1990 Ukpo told reporters that 10 officers and more than 150 soldiers from the lower ranks had been arrested in an attempted coup attempt against Babangida.

He was retired as a Brigadier.

Later career
His wife, Sally Ufuoma Ukpo, was a teacher and in 2006 was running a travel and tours company.

After retirement, he became a member of the board of directors of Skye Bank.

When Cross River state Governor Donald Duke put up the Metropolitan Hotel for sale, Ukpo was said to have made the highest bid of N600 million. His offer was turned down, and the hotel later sold for N200 million.

In September 2008 he presented the results of a feasibility study for a mono-rail system of transportation in Port Harcourt. Ukpo was the leader of a partnership to construct the railway.

In October 2009 the Rivers State government signed an agreement with TSI Property and Investment Holdings to undertake the project at a cost of $318 million. Ukpo said that the mono-rail would be the first of its kind in Africa.

In an interview in July 2009, Ukpo protested strongly against the recent transfer of 76 oil wells from Cross River State to Akwa Ibom State, and expressed hope that a committee set up by President Umaru Yar'Adua would find a politically reasonable solution. 

He has been a vocal voice in politics right from the grass root to the federal level.

References

1947 births
2021 deaths
Nigerian military governors of Rivers State
People from Cross River State